Passages may refer to:

Music
Passages (Frank Gambale album) or the title song, 1994
Passages (Jesus Jones album), 2018
Passages (Justin Rutledge album) or the title song, 2019
Passages (Ravi Shankar and Philip Glass album), 1990
"Passages", a song by Kenny G from The Moment, 1996

Other uses
Passages (2004 film), a Chinese drama film
Passages (2008 film), a Canadian short documentary film
Passages (2023 film), an upcoming French-German film
"Passages" (Happy Days), a television episode
Passages Malibu, an addiction rehabilitation center in California
Passages, a 1976 book by Gail Sheehy

See also
Pasages (steam trawler)
Passage (disambiguation)